A statue of Alexander Andreyevich Baranov is installed in Sitka, Alaska. The memorial has been vandalized, and was relocated to the Sitka Historical Society and Museum in Harrigan Centennial Hall on September 29, 2020.

See also
 List of monuments and memorials removed during the George Floyd protests

References

Buildings and structures in Sitka, Alaska
Monuments and memorials in Alaska
Monuments and memorials removed during the George Floyd protests
Outdoor sculptures in Alaska
Sculptures of men in the United States
Statues in Alaska
Vandalized works of art in Alaska